The Royal Society of London Michael Faraday Prize is awarded for "excellence in communicating science to UK audiences". Named after Michael Faraday, the medal itself is made of silver gilt, and is accompanied by a purse of £2500.

Background
The prize was first awarded in 1986 to Charles Taylor for "his outstanding presentations of physics and applications of physics, aimed at audiences from six-year-old primary school children to adults". It is awarded annually and unlike other Royal Society awards such as the Hughes Medal, it has been presented every year since its inception.  The winner is required to present a lecture as part of the Society's annual programme of public events, which is usually held in January of the following year; during the lecture, the President of the Royal Society awards the medal. Unlike other prizes awarded by the society, the committee has not always publicly provided a rationale. This has occurred five times—in 2004 to Martin Rees, in 2006 to Richard Fortey, in 2007 to Jim Al-Khalili,  in 2008 to John D. Barrow and most recently in 2009 to Marcus du Sautoy.

List of recipients

References 
General

Specific

Awards established in 1986
Awards of the Royal Society
Michael Faraday
Royal Society lecture series
Science communication awards
Science education in the United Kingdom
Science writing awards